Daghagheleh (also Romanized as Daghāgheleh; also known as Dāgheleh and Daqāqeleh) is a large Town in Anaqcheh Rural District, in the Central District of Ahvaz County, Khuzestan Province, Iran. At the 2006 census, its population was 3,876, in 856 families, Currently 2021 The estimated population is 5500.

References 

Populated places in Ahvaz County